Only Hits is an album by The Ventures.  It was released as a double LP in 1973. It was also released in Quadraphonic sound on a double 8-track tape set.

Track listing
 "Also Sprach Zarathustra" – 4:30
 "Hummingbird/Summerbreeze" – 3:34
 "Get Down" – 2:31
 "Soul Makossa" – 3:10
 "My Love" – 3:27
 "Cisco Kid" – 3:25
 "Listen Now!" – Fox, Gimbel 	3:37
 "Oh Babe, What Would You Say" – 3:15
 "Yesterday Once More" – 3:37
 "Superstition" – 3:17
 "Last Tango in Paris" – 2:44
 "Dueling Banjos" – 1:55
 "Live and Let Die" – 2:56
 "The Morning After" – 2:34
 "Drift Away" – 3:59
 "Alone Again (Naturally)" – 2:59
 "I Can See Clearly Now" – 2:46
 "Finders Keepers" – 2:56
 "The Twelfth of Never" – 2:29
 "Frankenstein" – 2:28
 "The Night the Lights Went Out in Georgia" – 3:12
 "Are You Man Enough" – 2:52
 "You Are the Sunshine of My Life" – 2:50

1973 greatest hits albums
The Ventures albums
United Artists Records compilation albums